Joseph Daigle (June 7, 1831 – March 12, 1908) was a merchant, civil servant and political figure in Quebec. He represented Verchères in the Legislative Assembly of Quebec from 1871 to 1878 as a Liberal.

He was born in Saint-Ours, the son of François Daigle and Angèle Gareau. In 1858, he married Marie-Eugénie-Mélina Hertel de Rouville, the daughter of seigneur Jean-Baptiste-René Hertel de Rouville. Daigle was later employed by the Department of Immigration at Montreal. He died there at the age of 76.

His nephew Jean-Baptiste Brousseau also served as a member of the Quebec assembly.

References
 

1846 births
1907 deaths
Quebec Liberal Party MNAs